Johns is an unincorporated community in Rankin County, Mississippi, United States.

References

Unincorporated communities in Rankin County, Mississippi
Unincorporated communities in Mississippi